Briz may refer to:

Ángel Sanz Briz, Spanish diplomat
Briz-M, Russian orbit insertion booster stage